Milner Pass, elevation  is a mountain pass in the Rocky Mountains of northern Colorado in the United States. It is located on the continental divide in the Front Range, within Rocky Mountain National Park, along the boundary between Larimer and Grand counties. The pass provides the passage over the continental divide for  US 34, also known as Trail Ridge Road between Estes Park and Grand Lake. Along with the rest of Trail Ridge Road, the pass is generally closed in winter from the first heavy snow fall (usually October) until the opening of the road around Memorial Day. The gentle pass divides the headwaters of the Cache la Poudre River (which issues from Poudre Lake just east of the pass) and several creeks near the headwaters of the Colorado River to the west. The road near the pass provides a panoramic view of the Never Summer Mountains to the west.

The pass is named in honor of T.J. Milner, an engineer who surveyed a potential railroad route over the pass. The railroad was never built.

References

Landforms of Larimer County, Colorado
Landforms of Grand County, Colorado
Mountain passes of Colorado
Rocky Mountain National Park
Great Divide of North America
Transportation in Grand County, Colorado
Transportation in Larimer County, Colorado
U.S. Route 34